Natogyi is a town and seat of Natogyi Township in the Mandalay Region of central Myanmar.

Populated places in Mandalay Region
Township capitals of Myanmar